Benita Haastrup (born 1964) is a drummer, percussionist, educator and composer in Denmark.

She studied at the Rhythmic Music Conservatory in Copenhagen, graduating in 1992. In 1998, she received the Ben Webster Prize. Haastrup has been a member of Marilyn Mazur's Percussion Paradise and of the all-female jazz group Sophisticated Ladies. She has also performed with Richard B. Boone, Idrees Sulieman, Johnny Griffin, Muhal Richard Abrams, Duke Jordan, Bent Jædig, John Tchicai, Fred Hopkins and Jesper Thilo, among others. She has performed in the United States, China, Africa and throughout most of Europe.

Haastrup teaches at the Rhythmic Music Conservatory.

References

External links 
 

1964 births
Living people
Danish jazz drummers
Danish music educators
Place of birth missing (living people)
Danish women composers
20th-century Danish composers
21st-century Danish composers
Women music educators
20th-century women composers
21st-century women composers